Hassan Mohammed may refer to:

 Hassan Mohammed (footballer) (born 1989), Emirati footballer
 Hassan Mohammed (cricketer) (born 1980), Malaysian cricketer